Philip Swenk Markley (July 2, 1789 – September 12, 1834) was an American politician from Pennsylvania who served as a member of the U.S. House of Representatives for Pennsylvania's 5th congressional district from 1823 to 1827 and as Attorney General of Pennsylvania from 1829 to 1830.

Early life and education
Markley was born in Skippack, Pennsylvania.  He moved to Norristown, studied law, was admitted to the bar in 1810 and commenced the practice of law.

Career
He was deputy State’s attorney for Pennsylvania 1819 and 1820 and a member of the Pennsylvania State Senate for the 7th district from 1820 to 1823.  He was elected as a Jackson Republican to the Eighteenth Congress and reelected as an Adams Party candidate to the Nineteenth Congress.  He was an unsuccessful candidate for reelection in 1826 to the Twentieth Congress.  He was appointed naval officer of Philadelphia by President Andrew Jackson and served from 1826 to 1829.  He served as attorney general of Pennsylvania in 1829.  He died in Norristown in 1834.  Interment in Saint John Episcopal Church Cemetery in Norristown, Pennsylvania.

Notes

Sources 
 
 The Political Graveyard

|-

1789 births
1834 deaths
18th-century American Episcopalians
19th-century American Episcopalians
19th-century American politicians
Burials in Pennsylvania
Democratic-Republican Party members of the United States House of Representatives from Pennsylvania
Military personnel from Philadelphia
National Republican Party members of the United States House of Representatives
Pennsylvania Attorneys General
Pennsylvania lawyers
Pennsylvania National Republicans
Pennsylvania state senators
People from Montgomery County, Pennsylvania
19th-century American lawyers